Alvorecer is the seventh album released by Clara Nunes in 1974 for the Odeon label. Due to the success of the song Conto de Areia, the album eventually went on to sell over 300,000 copies in Brazil, making Nunes one of the biggest selling female artists of her time. Despite generally being held in high esteem by many critics, the album has languished out of print for over a decade.

Track listing
 "Menino Deus"
 "Samba da volta" 
 "Sindorerê" 
 "O que é que a baiana tem"
 "Meu sapato já furou"
 "Punhal"
 "Alvorecer"
 "Nanaê, Nanã Naiana"
 "Conto de areia"
 "Pau-de-arara"
 "Esse meu cantar"

References

1974 albums
Clara Nunes albums